An alpine garden (or alpinarium, alpinum) is a domestic or botanical garden, or more often a part of a larger garden, specializing in the collection and cultivation of alpine plants growing naturally at high altitudes around the world, such as in the Caucasus, Pyrenees, Rocky Mountains, Alps, Himalayas and Andes.  It is one of the most common types of rock garden.

An alpine garden tries to imitate the conditions of the plants' place of origin. One example of this is using large stones and gravel beds, rather than the soil that naturally grows there. Though the plants can cope with low temperatures, they dislike standing in damp soil during the winter months. The soil used is typically poor (sandy) but extremely well-drained. One of the main obstacles in developing an alpine garden is the unsuitable conditions which exist in some areas, particularly mild or severe winters and heavy rainfall, such as those present in the United Kingdom and Ireland. This can be avoided by growing the plants in an alpine house (essentially an unheated greenhouse), which tries to reproduce the ideal conditions, or just covering them with a raised sheet of glass in winter.

Vegetation

Typical plants found in an alpine garden include: 
 Androsace
 Arabis alpina (rock cress)
 Campanula - alpine species
 Dianthus - alpine species
 Gentiana
 Geranium dalmaticum (cranesbill)
 Globularia
 Iberis sempervirens (candytuft)
 Leontopodium
 Phlox subulata
 Pulsatilla vulgaris (pasque flower)
 Primula - alpine species
 Ranunculus (buttercup)
 Rhodanthemum hosmariense
 Saxifraga - alpine species
 Scutellaria orientalis (helmet flower)
 Sedum spathulifolium (stonecrop)
 Sisyrinchium
 Thymus (thyme)

Botanical gardens with an alpine house or garden

Austria
 Botanical Garden of the University of Innsbruck
Belgium
 Plantentuin Universiteit Gent
China
 Lijiang Alpine Botanic Garden

France
 Jardin des Plantes
 Jardin botanique alpin du Lautaret
Jardin botanique alpin La Jaÿsinia

Germany
 Botanischer Erlebnisgarten Altenburg
 Botanical Garden in Berlin
 Botanischer Garten Bielefeld
 Botanischer Garten Düsseldorf
 Botanischer Garten Gießen
 Botanischer Garten der Johann Wolfgang Goethe-Universität Frankfurt am Main
 Botanischer Garten München-Nymphenburg
 Botanischer Garten Münster
 Botanischer Garten Marburg
 Botanischer Garten Potsdam
 Botanischer Garten der Ruhr-Universität Bochum

Italy
 Orto botanico di Padova

 Slovenia
 Alpine Botanical Garden Juliana

 The Netherlands

 Botanische Tuin Fort Hoofddijk
 Hortus Botanicus Amsterdam

United Kingdom
 Royal Botanic Gardens, Kew
 RHS Wisley
 Royal Botanic Garden Edinburgh

United States
 Betty Ford Alpine Gardens
 Denver Botanic Gardens

See also
 List of garden types

References

External links 
 Alpine Garden Society
 North American Rock Garden Society
 Scottish Rock Garden Club
 New Zealand Alpine Garden Society
(English) Alpine Garden Society - Dublin Group - Home Page
 Nederlandse Rotsplanten Vereniging 
 Vlaamse Rotsplanten Vereniging

Making a Rock Garden by Henry Sherman Adams, 1912

Botanical gardens